"Ready Steady Go" is the twenty-third single by L'Arc-en-Ciel, released on February 4, 2004; it reached number 1 on the Oricon chart. The four alternate versions on the single omit each titular band member's contributions; for instance, the "Hydeless Version" features none of hyde's vocals (but still contains the backing vocals), while the "Yukihiroless Version" has no percussion whatsoever.

"Ready Steady Go" was used as the second (first in the U.S. Adult Swim broadcast) opening song to the first Fullmetal Alchemist anime series. It was featured as a song in the Japan-exclusive Nintendo DS launch music video game, Daigasso! Band Brothers, along with the Japan-exclusive 2005 iNiS music video game Osu! Tatakae! Ouendan as the last stage.

Track listing

Covers
American punk rock band Zebrahead loosely translated and covered the song, which features on a tribute album to L'Arc-en-Ciel. It was also released as a Japanese bonus track on their 2013 album Call Your Friends.

The song was covered by Afterglow, a fictional all-female band from the multimedia franchise BanG Dream!, and became playable in the Girls Band Party! game beginning October 27, 2017. A full version of the song is included in the album BanG Dream! Girls Band Party! Cover Collection Vol.1 released on June 27, 2018. It was also covered by Argonavis, a fictional rock band from the related Argonavis from BanG Dream! and added in its AAside game on January 14, 2021.

References

2004 singles
2004 songs
L'Arc-en-Ciel songs
Ki/oon Music singles
Fullmetal Alchemist songs
Oricon Weekly number-one singles
Songs written by Hyde (musician)
Songs written by Tetsuya (musician)